Mordellistena antiqua is a beetle in the genus Mordellistena of the family Mordellidae. It was described in 1941 by Ermisch.

References

antiqua
Beetles described in 1941